Mincho Kolev Neychev (Bulgarian: Минчо Колев Нейчев) (4 April 1887 – 11 August 1956) was a Bulgarian Communist political figure. He was born in Stara Zagora, and served as the Chairman of the Presidium of the National Assembly (head of state) between 1947 and 1950. He then served as foreign minister of Bulgaria from 1950 until his death on 11 August 1956.

See also 
List of Bulgarians

External links 

1887 births
1956 deaths
Politicians from Stara Zagora
Bulgarian Communist Party politicians